is a Japanese footballer who plays as a forward for Kyoto Sanga FC. He became the first football player from Japan to play in Allsvenskan, the highest league in Sweden.

Career statistics

Club

References

External links

Japanese footballers
Allsvenskan players
1994 births
Living people
SC Freiburg II players
FC 08 Homburg players
Halmstads BK players
Sint-Truidense V.V. players
Stabæk Fotball players
Urawa Red Diamonds players
Mito HollyHock players
Superettan players
Belgian Pro League players
Eliteserien players
J1 League players
J2 League players
Japanese expatriate sportspeople in Germany
Japanese expatriate sportspeople in Sweden
Japanese expatriate sportspeople in Belgium
Japanese expatriate sportspeople in Norway
Expatriate footballers in Germany
Expatriate footballers in Sweden
Expatriate footballers in Belgium
Expatriate footballers in Norway
Association football midfielders